Vice is a 2007 Russian crime action film directed by Valery Todorovsky.

Plot 
The film takes place in a southern city. The film tells about a successful DJ who dreams of becoming a professional musician. But life turned out differently...

Cast 
 Maksim Matveyev as Denis
 Fedor Bondarchuk as Verner (as Fyodor Bondarchuk)
 Aleksey Serebryakov as Dudaytis
 Evgenia Brik as Taya (as Evgeniya Khirivskaya)
 Ekaterina Vilkova as Masha
 Anton Shagin
 Igor Voynarovskiy
 Konstantin Balakirev
 Denis Yasik
 Denis Balandin as Amigo

References

External links 
 

2007 films
2000s crime action films
2000s Russian-language films
Russian crime action films
Russian crime thriller films
Russian action thriller films
Films directed by Valery Todorovsky